K. M. Anowarul Islam is a Bangladesh Nationalist Party politician and the former Member of Parliament of Pabna-3.

Career
Islam was elected to parliament from Pabna-3 as a Bangladesh Nationalist Party candidate in 2001.

References

Bangladesh Nationalist Party politicians
Living people
8th Jatiya Sangsad members
Year of birth missing (living people)